Kenneth Campbell (6 September 1892 – 28 April 1971) was a Scottish footballer, who played as a goalkeeper for Liverpool, Partick Thistle, New Brighton, Stoke City and Leicester City. Campbell also played in eight full international matches for Scotland between 1920 and 1922.

Club career

Liverpool
Born in Cambuslang, Lanarkshire, Scotland, Campbell played for local Junior-grade teams Rutherglen Glencairn and Cambuslang Rangers in his early years; he won the Glasgow Junior League with the latter and twice represented Scotland at that level.

Liverpool manager Tom Watson brought him to Anfield in May 1911. In a contemporary interview he credited Donald McKinlay (a childhood acquaintance from his hometown) in assisting him during his early days at the club.

Campbell did not make his debut until 10 February 1912 in a Division One match at Ewood Park, a game that saw the Reds lose to Blackburn Rovers 1–0. Known for having safe hands, the goalkeeper took over from Sam Hardy after Hardy moved to Aston Villa, and proved to be just as secure as Liverpool's last line of defence. He only missed one game during the 1912–13 season, before he was replaced by his young understudy, Elisha Scott.

Campbell did put up a decent fight for the number 1 jersey, playing in all but four games of the 1913–14 campaign, and he was between the sticks for the 1914 FA Cup Final at the Crystal Palace ground on 25 April. The game finished disappointingly for Liverpool, in a 1–0 defeat to Burnley. The match was to be the last to be played at this venue and it was played in front of a reigning monarch for the very first time, George V. Like many footballers of his era, Campbell's career was interrupted for four years due to the First World War, however upon his return to the game in 1919 he found himself once again number 1 for Liverpool. He stayed there until April 1920, when he played what turned out to be his last game for the club.

Later career
Campbell left Liverpool in April 1920, returning to Scotland to play for Partick Thistle for a fee of £1750 where he played in the club's underdog victory in the 1921 Scottish Cup – still the only occasion they have won the trophy.

He returned south of the border to New Brighton (primarily for family reasons, as they had remained on Merseyside when he went to Partick) before joining Stoke City in 1923. Campbell was used as second choice 'keeper to Bob Dixon and in his four seasons spent at the Victoria Ground he made 35 appearances. He then spent another four seasons at Leicester City before ending his career with a two-year spell with old club New Brighton.

International career
Campbell was capped eight times by Scotland (four times while at Liverpool and four while at Partick), his debut coming in a British Home Championship match at Ninian Park, Cardiff against Wales in 1920; the game finished in a 1–1 draw.

He had also been selected in an unofficial wartime international in May 1916 (the only game of this nature during the course of the war itself).

Career statistics

Club
Source:

International
Source:

See also
List of Scotland national football team captains
List of Scotland wartime international footballers

References

External links
 Player profile at LFChistory.net

1892 births
Liverpool F.C. players
Partick Thistle F.C. players
New Brighton A.F.C. players
Stoke City F.C. players
Leicester City F.C. players
Scottish footballers
Scotland international footballers
1971 deaths
Sportspeople from Cambuslang
Cambuslang Rangers F.C. players
Rutherglen Glencairn F.C. players
Partick Thistle F.C. wartime guest players
Scotland wartime international footballers
Scottish Football League players
Scottish Football League representative players
English Football League players
Association football goalkeepers
Scotland junior international footballers
Scottish Junior Football Association players
British Army personnel of World War I
FA Cup Final players
Footballers from South Lanarkshire